Edward Godfrey Cuthbert Frederick Atchley MRCS LRCP (1869–1943) was an English surgeon and Anglican liturgical scholar associated with the Alcuin Club.

He was a member of the Royal College of Physicians and the Royal College of Surgeons.

He wrote numerous books and journal articles.  His work on the use of incense in worship has been cited in modern medical and anthropological monographs and journal articles.

He also was a local historian of Bristol.   Among other topics, he wrote descriptions of historic churches, such as an examination of parish records for St. Nicholas Church, Bristol,  which later were destroyed during the Bristol Blitz.

He was a member of the Henry Bradshaw Society.

He was married to May Florence Heriot Atchley.

His papers are in the Lambeth Palace Archives.

Bibliography  
Essays on Ceremonial (1904)
(editor) Ordo Romanus Primus (1905)
The People's Prayers: Being Some Considerations on the Use of the Litany in Public Worship (1906)
'On the Mediaeval Parish Records of the Church of St. Nicholas, Bristol',  Transactions of the St. Paul's Ecclesiological Society 6 (October 1906); 35-67.
'Some inventories of the parish church of St. Stephen, Bristol', Transactions of the St Paul's Ecclesiological Society, 6, part 3 (1908), 161-84.
A History of the Use of Incense in Divine Worship (1909)
'Some More Bristol Inventories', Transactions of the St. Paul's Ecclesiological Society, 9 Part 2 (1922), 1-50.

References

External links 
Bibliographic directory from Project Canterbury

1869 births
1943 deaths
English male non-fiction writers
Anglican liturgists
20th-century English male writers
20th-century British non-fiction writers
English religious writers
English surgeons
Historians of Bristol